The Old Lakeland High School, also formerly known as the Polk Opportunity Center, is an historic 3-story redbrick school building located at 400 North Florida Avenue in Lakeland, Florida, U.S.. Built in 1926, it was designed by architect Edward Columbus Hosford in the late Gothic Revival architectural style.

On September 30, 1993, it was added to the National Register of Historic Places.  Over the years the building has housed several different schools including the Polk Opportunity Center, Lakeland Junior High School, and Lakeland Middle Academy.  Lakeland Middle Academy was renamed Lawton Chiles Middle Academy in 1999, to honor the passing of former Florida governor Lawton Chiles—himself an alumnus of Lakeland High School.

See also
Lakeland High School

Gallery

References

External links

 Polk County listings
 Florida's Office of Cultural and Historical Programs
 Polk County listings

Edward Columbus Hosford buildings
Schools in Lakeland, Florida
National Register of Historic Places in Polk County, Florida
Gothic Revival architecture in Florida
School buildings completed in 1926
1926 establishments in Florida